"Une colombe" (meaning "A Dove") is the first single from Celine Dion's album Mélanie. It was released on 18 June 1984 in Quebec, Canada. It was written by Marcel Lefebvre and Paul Baillargeon. The song speaks of a world full of peace, love and friendship. On 10 September 1984, Dion sang it for the Pope John Paul II and 65,000 of people at the Olympic Stadium in Montreal, Quebec. "Une colombe" also won two Félix Awards for Best Selling Single of the Year and the Pop Song of the Year. It was featured on Dion's 2005 greatest hits album On ne change pas.

Commercial performance
The single was a hit. On 30 June 1984 it entered the Quebec Singles Chart and reached number 2, spending forty four weeks on chart in total. It has sold over 50,000 copies in Canada and received Gold certification in November 1984.

Track listings and formats
Canadian 7" single
"Une colombe" – 3:10
"Une colombe" (Instrumental Version) – 3:10

Charts

Certifications and sales

See also
Félix Award

References

1984 singles
1984 songs
Celine Dion songs
French-language songs
Pop ballads
Song recordings produced by Eddy Marnay
Songs written by Paul Baillargeon